Rebakah Cooper (known as Beka) is a fictional character in the Provost's Dog trilogy by Tamora Pierce. The novels in the trilogy--Terrier, Bloodhound, and Mastiff—span her career from a "puppy," (an apprentice), to one of the most well-respected "dogs" that police the crime-ridden Lower City, as well as the rest of the country of Tortall.

Appearance
Beka is slender and tall at five feet and eight inches. She has dark-blond hair and light blue-gray eyes that unsettle people when she's mad. Someone once told her that it's like being touched by ice when she glares at people, though Beka herself can neither prove nor disprove this, seeing as she's never seen her face while angry

In Mastiff, she notes that after four years as a dog, she's beginning to collect wounds that ache even after being healed—broken fingers, and so on. Despite her callouses and scars—products of her job—Beka is regarded as pretty, and several men have been attracted to and flirted with her.

Childhood
Two-hundred years before the Song of the Lioness series, Rebekah (Beka) Cooper was born in the Cesspool, which is the worst slum in the Lower City—the crime-ridden, poverty-filled latter half of the capital city of Tortall. When her mother was attacked by one of the members of the then rampant Bold Brass Gang, the eight-year-old Beka tracked them down and pestered the Provost's Guard—the police of the realm—until the Lord Provost himself finally listened to her.

After catching the rats—the lingo for criminals—the Lord Provost takes Beka and her family in, though unfortunately, her mother dies soon later from lung cancer. Beka's two younger brothers and sisters, however, remain happily at Lord Gershom's home as maids, couriers, and other respectable positions. Beka, on the other hand, wants to be a dog, much to the disgust of Lord Gershom's wife and his pleasure.

Beka also becomes a message-runner at Lord Gershom's home, and learns her way about Corus through this job.

Career

Puppy
The first book of the trilogy, Terrier, spans Beka's time as a puppy, or dog-in-training. She is assigned to Clary Goodwin and Mattes Tunstall, two of the toughest, most legendary dogs of the Lower City. From the start it is clear that Goodwin does not desire a puppy, and Beka must work to prove her worth.

As she gradually demonstrates her own unique skills—she's able to hear the voices of ghosts—and learns new ones from her trainers, Beka stumbles upon twin mysteries: children are disappearing and being returned for a ransom, and diggers are being hired to search for the precious fire-opal, then murdered.

With the help of her new trainers, Pounce—a talking constellation in the form of a cat, as well as her fellow puppies and the new, less law-abiding friends that move into her landing house, Beka manages to catch both criminals and establish herself as a true dog.

Dog
In the second two books of the trilogy, Bloodhound and Mastiff, Beka is a full-fledged dog. In Bloodhound, she is reassigned to Tunstall and Goodwin as a partner after her previous partners all end up dumping her. Beka acquires scent-hound Achoo during this time, and she and Goodwin travel to Port Caynn to investigate rumors of cole-mongers, who produce and distribute counterfeit coins.

In Mastiff, which takes place three years after Bloodhound, Beka and Tunstall embark on a highly-secretive hunt in an attempt to find the kidnapped prince of Tortall. The stakes are higher than they've ever been as the royal family is threatened with betrayal from their nobles and mages, with only Beka, Tunstall, and Lord Gershom standing in their way.

Skills
Beka was a diligent student as a Puppy and consequently, learned combat and other police-related skills well. Lord Gershom notes that she is especially good at observing those around her, and that she knows the Lower City better than most. She's also learned less legal skills, such as how to pick locks, from her friends in the Court of the Rogue, Tortall's criminal underworld.

A gift that gives her an edge in her work is her magical ability to hear the voices of the dead. Many ghosts ride pigeons when they are unsettled—usually because they've been murdered—and Beka is able to hear their stories and send them on their way. She's also able to hear dust-spinners, or small tornados in street-corners that collect voices and conversations around them. Beka always feeds these non-human informants, either with cracked corn for the birds or dirt from different parts of the city for the dust-spinners.

She inherited this magical ability from her father's side of the family, and learned to use it from her Granny Fern.

Relationships

Family
Little is known about her father (except that he had the same magic that Beka herself carries), but Beka's mother was an herbalist before she died of lung cancer, leaving Beka the oldest of five children. Beka has two younger sisters and two younger brothers, named (oldest to youngest) Diona, Lorine, Willes, and Nilo, respectively. All of her siblings live in Lord Gershom's house and serve as ladies-in-waiting, seamstresses, couriers, or stable-boys.

Beka doesn't have a close relationship with her sisters due to their loyalty to Lord Gershom's wife—Lady Teodorie—who disapproves of Beka's career. She has a slightly better relationship with her younger brothers, and plays knife games with them when she goes to visit. Beka also has a good relationship with her Granny Fern, a saucy old lady with good humor and attitude, whom is her grandmother on her father's side.

It is revealed throughout the series that she has a cousin named Lilac and another cousin on her father's side named Philben, or Phil. Her descendants include Eleni Cooper, George Cooper, and later the children and grandchildren of Alanna of Trebond, who marries George Cooper.

Romantic Relationships
Beka has been sexually active on more than one occasion, especially during her fling with Dale Rowan while at Port Caynn in Bloodhound. She also shares sexual tension with Rosto the Piper, who becomes the Rogue—the King of the Court of the Rogue—while she is a puppy. While she refuses to let their chemistry become anything more on the grounds that they live on the opposite sides of the law, Rosto continues to pursue her throughout the trilogy.

In Mastiff, it is revealed that she was engaged to Holborn Shaftstall before he was killed by slave-guards, then goes on to find true love with the very silly but extremely patient and kind mage, Farmer Cape.

Friends
Despite her claim to shyness, Beka is popular among her fellow puppies as well as those who live in her landing house. Friends from her training days include Ersken, Verene, and Phelan. Out of these three, Verene is killed and Phelan, who loved her, turns to the Court of the Rogue in his grief.

Beka's oldest friend is Tansy Lofts, who lived on Mutt Piddle Lane with her before marrying into one of the richest families in the Lower City, the Lofts. Despite her sudden rise in status, the two girls remain close friends, and Beka finds Tansy's kidnapped husband after her son is kidnapped and killed by the shadow snake in the first book of the trilogy.

In Terrier, three rats—the slang word for criminals—move into her landing-house, and soon befriend Beka. This group includes the hedgewitch Kora, swordswoman Aniki, and Rosto the Piper, who becomes the Rogue.

Characters in fantasy literature